Nietta is a rural locality in the local government area of Central Coast, in the North West region of Tasmania. The 2016 census determined a population of 64 for the state suburb of Nietta.

History
The name was used for a parish from 1886. Nietta is an Aboriginal word meaning “little brother”. The locality was gazetted in 1965.

Geography
The Wilmot River forms most of the eastern boundary, and the River Leven forms much of the western.

Road infrastructure
The B15 route (Castra Road) enters from the north and terminates at Nietta village. Route C125 (South Preston Road) starts at an intersection with B15 and exits to the north-west. Route C128 (Loongana Road) starts from the end of B15 and runs south and west before exiting. Route C129 (South Nietta Road) starts from the end of B15 and runs south-east and south before exiting to South Nietta, where it turns west as Maxfields Road and re-enters Nietta after a short distance, ending at an intersection with C128.

References

Localities of Central Coast Council (Tasmania)
Towns in Tasmania